The 2011 Southern Utah Thunderbirds football team represented Southern Utah University as a member of the Great West Conference during the 2011 NCAA Division I FCS football season. The Thunderbirds were led by fourth-year head coach Ed Lamb and played their home games at Eccles Coliseum. Southern Utah compiled an overall record of 6–5 with a mark of 1–3 in conference play, tying for fourth place in the Great West. The Thunderbirds beat UNLV of the NCAA Division I Football Bowl Subdivision (FBS) on September 24,  which was program's second ever against a I-A/FBS. They beat Arkansas State in 1997.

This was Southern Utah's final year as a member of the Great West as they became a full member of the Big Sky Conference in 2012.

Schedule

References

Southern Utah
Southern Utah Thunderbirds football seasons
Southern Utah Thunderbirds football